Rafał Kuczynski (born 21 May 1982), better known by his stage name Human Error, is a Polish electronic record producer. He mostly works in the ambient music genre and produces only with a computer. Human Error's first songs were made around 2000, and his first official album was released in 2002 by Requiem Records.

Discography
 2005 - Shrinke - Land of Gods (promo album)
 2003 - Tajemnice Ludzkiej Dłoni (publisher: Requiem Records)
 2002 - Battery Farm (publisher: Requiem Records)

External links
 Official website

1982 births
Living people
Ambient musicians
Polish electronic musicians